Syntypistis witoldi is a species of moth of the family Notodontidae first described by Alexander Schintlmeister in 1997. It is found in Vietnam, Myanmar, Thailand and the Chinese province of Yunnan.

References

Moths described in 1997
Notodontidae